Franciszek Kawa (3 October 1901 – 10 February 1985) was a Polish cross-country skier. He competed in the men's 50 kilometre event at the 1928 Winter Olympics.

References

External links
 

1901 births
1985 deaths
Polish male cross-country skiers
Olympic cross-country skiers of Poland
Cross-country skiers at the 1928 Winter Olympics
Sportspeople from Lviv
People from the Kingdom of Galicia and Lodomeria
Polish Austro-Hungarians
Polish emigrants to Norway